Hapag-Lloyd Express (previously also marketed as HLX.com) was a no-frills, high-frequency, express airline based in Langenhagen, Germany. It operated services within Germany and to destinations in Europe.

In January 2007 it combined its operations with those of Hapag-Lloyd Flug to become TUIfly. While Hapag-Lloyd Flug operated all TUIfly flights, Hapag-Lloyd Express marketed them until TUIfly got its own licence.

History 

Hapag-Lloyd Express was established in 2002 and began operations in December 2002 – two months after Germanwings, its direct German competitor at hub Cologne Bonn airport. Despite starting its service later and serving fewer routes, HLX gained a higher name recognition and a better reputation through its category-defining campaign "Fly for the price of a taxi". The airline subsequently won the efficiency award "Effie" in Germany and Europe in recognition of its more effective branding and marketing.

Its main competitors were more established no-frills carriers such as Ryanair and EasyJet, as well as other low-cost startups such as Germanwings or Transavia.com, consequently being constantly engaged in a price war with these carriers. In an attempt to win this price war, it expanded rapidly in the first half of 2004, announcing many new routes that it viewed as underserved by other airlines. Examples of such routes include Dublin to Hamburg and Stuttgart, both of which are no longer in operation. In January 2007, Hapag-Lloyd Express and Hapag-Lloyd Flug were merged into the cooperation TUIfly in an attempt to reorganize TUI's airline portfolio.

HLX adopted the IATA code of the now defunct Russian Baikal Airlines.

Services 
Hapag-Lloyd Express offered no-frills services to destinations in Germany and Europe. Most of them are now operated by TUIfly.

Fleet 

All Hapag-Lloyd Express aircraft were wetleased from Hapag-Lloyd Flug or Germania. The fleet consisted of 17 Boeing 737 aircraft and two Fokker 100s. The Fokker 100s left Hapag-Lloyd Express in 2006.

Livery 
Hapag-Lloyd Express aircraft were highly recognisable due to their distinctive "New York taxi" style: a checkered black and white line wrapped around a yellow body, aiming to convey the image of quick and cheap point-to-point service.

References

External links

Hlx.com (archive)
HLX fleet age

European Low Fares Airline Association
Defunct airlines of Germany
Defunct European low-cost airlines
Airlines established in 2002
Airlines disestablished in 2007
German companies established in 2002
German companies disestablished in 2007